Beast Machines: Transformers is an animated television series produced by Mainframe Entertainment as part of the Transformers franchise. Hasbro has the full distribution rights to the show as of 2011. It was a direct sequel to Beast Wars, taking place within the continuity of the original Transformers series. The show ran for two seasons, airing on YTV and Fox Kids from 1999 to 2000. Of the Transformers animated series produced in North America, Beast Machines was the only one to have been completely conceptualized and outlined in advance, lending it a more serialized and linear storyline than the others. Prior to Transformers: Prime in 2010, Beast Machines was also the last, and second only entirely computer-animated Transformers series produced, along with its predecessor Beast Wars. The Beast Machines intro theme was "Phat Planet", by Leftfield. It is also the final installment in the Generation 1 cartoon era.

Synopsis

Following their victory in the Beast Wars, the surviving Maximals – Optimus Primal, Cheetor, Blackarachnia and Rattrap – finally return to Cybertron only to discover that their people have vanished, and the world is now ruled by the mindless Vehicons. To make matters worse, the quartet are trapped in their beast forms without any of the upgrades they gained during the Beast Wars – and they are swiftly losing their memories of anything but each other. Forced to retreat deep underground, the Maximals discover the Oracle, a powerful supercomputer that reformats their bodies into new, even more powerful techno-organic forms.

The Maximals soon learn that their old enemy Megatron – who managed to break free and return to Cyberton before them – is the malevolent intelligence behind the Vehicons. Megatron has declared war on both beast modes and free will itself, imprisoning the sparks of Cyberton's entire population. With the odds stacked against them, the Maximals set out to free the sparks of their people, discover what really happened to their allies Silverbolt and Rhinox, and bring organic life to Cyberton once more.

Cast
 Garry Chalk as Optimus Primal
 Scott McNeil as RatTrap, SilverBolt, Waspinator
 Ian James Corlett as Cheetor
 Venus Terzo as BlackArachnia 
 David Kaye as Megatron, Savage/Noble
 Christopher Gaze as D749n05t7c Dr0n3
 Brian Drummond as Jetstorm
 Paul Dobson as Tankor/Rhinox, Obsidian, D749n05t7c Dr0n3 #2
 Jim Byrnes as Thrust
 Alessandro Juliani as Nightscream
 Richard Newman as Tankor/Rhinox
 Kathleen Barr as Botanica
 Patricia Drake as Strika

Production
According to commentary of the Beast Machines DVD, the series was initially to be called Beast Hunters. The character Jetstorm was initially called Skybolt, but the writers changed the name to make it harder to theorize Silverbolt's connection to the Vehicon. The first five episodes of the series were filed with the name Skybolt, and later edited to reflect the change. At one point, Thrust was going to be carrying Silverbolt's spark, but the writers, on a whim, decided to have him carry Waspinator's spark instead. In the episode Home Soil, the character Thrust made a gesture similar to the middle-finger to Optimus while racing to the crashed ship and in the episode "Savage Noble", Thrust also made a gesture similar to the middle-finger to Cheetor when they briefly banded together to search for Savage. In the flashback featuring Waspinator, the heads of Inferno and Quickstrike make cameo appearances, as do the pre-humans Hammer, Jack, Una, and others.

Episodes

Series overview

Season 1 (1999)

Season 2 (2000): Battle for the Spark

Home releases
Beast Machines: Transformers (Episodes # 1–5)
 Format: Color, DVD-Video, NTSC
 Language: English
 Region: Region 1 (U.S. and Canada only)
 Aspect Ratio: 1.33:1
 Audio: 2.0 Dolby Surround
 Number of discs: 1
 Rating: PG in Canada
 Studio: Anchor Bay Entertainment Canada
 DVD Release Date: August 10, 2004
 Run Time: 107 minutes
Canada / United States

Beast Machines: Transformers – The Complete Series
 Format: Box set, Color, DVD-Video, NTSC
 Language: English
 Region: Region 1 (U.S. and Canada only)
 Aspect Ratio: 1.33:1
 Audio: 5.1 Dolby Surround & 2.0 Stereo
 Number of discs: 4
 Rating: Not Rated
 Studio: Kid Rhino Entertainment 
 DVD Release Date: February 28, 2006
 Run Time: 700 minutes
Canada / United States

Beast Machines – Transformers: Series 1
 Format: Dubbed, Full Screen, PAL
 Language English
 Region: Region 2
 Aspect Ratio: 1.33:1
 Audio: 5.1 Dolby Surround & 2.0 Stereo
 Number of discs: 2
 Classification: PG (Parental Guidance)
 Studio: Sony Pictures Home Entertainment
 DVD Release Date: 16 July 2007
 Run Time: 264 minutes

Beast Machines – Transformers: Series 2
 Format: Dubbed, Full Screen, PAL
 Language English
 Region: Region 2
 Aspect Ratio: 1.33:1
 Audio: 5.1 Dolby Surround & 2.0 Stereo
 Number of discs: 2
 Classification: PG (Parental Guidance)
 Studio: Sony Pictures Home Entertainment
 DVD Release Date: 19 November 2007
 Run Time: N/A
UK

Beast Machines – Transformers: Season 1 – Volumes 1 & 2
 DVD Release Date: 20 June 2007
 Audio: Dolby Digital 2.0 Stereo
 Aspect Ratio: 1.33:1
 Region: Region 4
Classification: PG (Parental Guidance)

Beast Machines – Transformers: Season 2 – Volumes 1 & 2
 DVD Release Date: 23 October 2007
 Audio: Dolby Digital 2.0 Stereo
 Aspect Ratio: 1.33:1
 Region: Region 4
 Classification: PG (Parental Guidance)

US / Canada
Beast Machines: Transformers – The Complete Series
 Format: Box set, Color, DVD-Video, NTSC
 Language: English
 Region: Region 1 (U.S. and Canada only)
 Aspect Ratio: 1.33:1
 Audio: 5.1 Dolby Surround & 2.0 Stereo
 Number of discs: 4
 Rating: Not Rated
 Studio: Shout! Factory
 DVD Release Date: September 2, 2014
 Run Time: 690 minutes

Other information
Written into a special edition comic book was a character by the name of Primal Prime. Appearing only in this book, he is a side character to the Beast Machines story and was later written into the toy lines of both Beast Machines and Transformers: Universe. In the Universe story line, he eventually gains a new body, which combined with Apelinq to create Sentinel Maximus.

The head writers used to post and answer questions on a message board known as Bottalk.

Toys
The Hasbro toys for Beast Machines are infamous for the fact that many bear little resemblance to the characters on the show, in both shape and color. They were also scaled out of proportion to each other. The reason for this was that although basic concept sketches were made of the major characters, the show creators and toy creators developed the characters independently from that point in the first year. After the first year of toys was released, a number of slightly more show-accurate toys were released.

Many of the characters created as toys never made it on the television series, although some did appear in the comic books. Oddly, the transforming plant Botanica from the television series was not made into a toy for any of the related toy lines.

Another characteristic of this toy line was its packaging. Unlike other Transformers lines, wherein each toy had a photo or illustration of themselves on the front of the packaging, almost all Beast Machines packages had an illustration of Cheetor on the front – regardless of character or faction. The one exception was Nightscream.

The toys released in the Beast Wars Returns (a release of Beast Machines in Japan) toy line by Takara were recolored to more closely resemble the show colors. Molds from the drones in the Vehicon Army, which bore more resemblance to the Vehicon Generals, were recolored and used as the Vehicon Generals instead in the Beast Wars Returns toy line.

A line of simple McDonald's Beast Machines toys was sold which did look more like the show characters, and this line was recolored for release in other countries by other fast-food restaurants.

Non-show groups
A number toy sub-groups didn't make it into the animated series, but had small stories on their toy boxes.
 Beast Riders
Two deluxe sized vehicles that resembled heads of animals and could be ridden by larger figures. Both were redecoed once each, but their boxes remained unchanged.
 Deployers
Three sparkless Maximal drones that turn into weapons usable by larger toys. All three were redecoed in new colors, but their boxes remained unchanged. The dark blue recolor of Rav was used to represent the character of Chro in the 3H Comic series, which the three Deployers in their original colors also appeared in.
 Dinobots
A set of Maximals, all recolors of older toys from the Beast Wars, Beast Wars Neo lines. Commanded by Magmatron and T-Wrecks, members included Airraptor and others. Like the Deployers, they appeared in the 3H Beast Machines comics.

Non-show characters

A number of characters appeared in the Beast Machines toy line who didn't make appearances in the television series. These included:

 Blastcharge – A Vehicon who turns into a six-wheeled missile truck. The character does appear in the Wreckers comics.
 Buzzsaw – A Maximal who transforms into a wasp. The character does appear in the Transformers: Universe comics.
 Battle Unicorn – A Maximal who turns into a unicorn.
 Che – A Beast Rider whose form is a cheetah head. The character was to appear in the un-produced Wreckers #4.
 Chro (Name given to purple Rav repaint) – Appears in Wreckers comics.
 Dillo – A Maximal Deployer who turns from an armadillo into a weapon. The character does appear in Wreckers comics.
 Geckobot – A Maximal who transforms into a flying lizard.
 Hammerstrike – A Maximal who transforms into a hammerhead shark.
 Longhorn – A Maximal who turns into a bull. The character was to appear in the un-produced Wreckers #4.
 Mechatron – A Beast Rider whose form is a dragon head.
 Mirage – A high speed Vehicon race car. The character appears in Apelinq's War Journals, his drones appear in Wreckers comics.
 Mol – A Maximal Deployer who turns from a mole into a weapon. The character did appear in Wreckers comics.
 Nightviper – A Maximal who transforms into a cobra.
 Primal Prime – A repaint of Beast Wars Optimal Optimus. The character does appear in the Wreckers comics.
 Quickstrike – A Maximal who transforms into a wolf. The character does appear in the Transformers: Universe comics.
 Rav – A Maximal Deployer who turns from a bird into a weapon. The character does appear in the Wreckers comics.
 Scavenger – A Vehicon Demolitions expert. The character does appear in the Wreckers comics.
 Skydive – A Maximal who turns a pterodactyl. The character was to appear in the un-produced Wreckers #4.
 Snarl – A Maximal who turns into a lion. The character does appear in the un-produced Wreckers #3, and the Transformers: Universe comics
 Spy Streak – A Vehicon stealth jet. The character does appear in the Wreckers comics.

Transtech
After Beast Machines ended, Hasbro planned a follow-up series called Transtech. The series was supposed to bring back some of the characters who died in Beast Wars along with some characters from the original 1980s cartoon, all in new, organic-looking bodies, with vehicle alternate modes instead of the animals used in Beast Machines. Many concept sketches and even a few toy prototypes were made, but Hasbro scrapped the idea, bringing Car Robots to American markets as a placeholder until Transformers Armada.

Concept sketches or prototype toys have been seen for Blackarachnia, Cheetor, Depth Charge, Megatron, Nightscream, Optimus Prime, Scavenger, Shockwave, Soundwave, Starscream, and a new character called Immorticon. There were also rumors of a Transtech Dinobot.

It is generally believed that the concept for Transtech Cheetor inspired the design of Transformers: Cybertron Brakedown and the concept for Transtech Megatron inspired Armada Megatron.

Transformers: Universe
The storyline of Beast Machines is continued in the short-lived comic book Transformers: Universe by 3H Publishing, which has stories taking place during the second season of Beast Machines (In the Transformers: Wreckers comic) and after the Beast Machines story (in the Transformers: Universe comic).

References

External links

 
 
 

1990s American animated television series
2000s American animated television series
1990s American science fiction television series
2000s American science fiction television series
1999 American television series debuts
2000 American television series endings
1990s Canadian animated television series
2000s Canadian animated television series
1990s Canadian science fiction television series
2000s Canadian science fiction television series
1999 Canadian television series debuts
2000 Canadian television series endings
American children's animated action television series
American children's animated space adventure television series
American children's animated science fantasy television series
American children's animated superhero television series
American computer-animated television series
Canadian children's animated action television series
Canadian children's animated space adventure television series
Canadian children's animated science fantasy television series
Canadian children's animated superhero television series
Canadian computer-animated television series
Fox Kids
Fox Broadcasting Company original programming
YTV (Canadian TV channel) original programming
Transformers (franchise) animated television series
American sequel television series
Animated television series about animals
Transformers: Beast Wars
Transformers: Generation 1
Works by Len Wein
English-language television shows
Television series by Hasbro Studios
Television series by Rainmaker Studios
Computer-animated television series